Elections Act may refer to:

 Canada Elections Act, 2000
 Elections Act 2001, UK
 Elections Act 1958, Malaysia
 Elections ACT is the branding of the Australian Capital Territory Electoral Commission